Rolf Storm (5 August 1930 – 23 July 2000) was a Swedish boxer. He competed in the men's light heavyweight event at the 1952 Summer Olympics.

References

External links
 

1930 births
2000 deaths
Swedish male boxers
Olympic boxers of Sweden
Boxers at the 1952 Summer Olympics
Sportspeople from Norrköping
Light-heavyweight boxers
20th-century Swedish people